Athletics competitions at the 2017 Central American Games were held at the Estadio Olímpico del IND Managua in Managua, Nicaragua, between December 9–12, 2017. The two marathon events were held on December 17, 2017.

Medal summary

Men

Women

Medal table

Participation
A total of 194 athletes (108 men and 86 women) from 7 countries were reported to participate:

 (14)
 (30)
 (32)
 (40)
 (11)
 (40)
 Panamá (27)

References

2017
Central American Games
2017 Central American Games
Central American Games